J. Alexander may refer to:

People
 J. Alexander (comics artist) (born 1975), painter, illustrator and draftsman
 J. Alexander (model) (born 1958), American model, runway coach and panelist on America's Next Top Model
 J. Alexander (politician) (born 1938), Indian politician
 J. D. Alexander (born 1959), American businessman politician
 J. D. Alexander (coach) (1899–1962), college football coach
 J. Neil Alexander (born 1954), Anglican liturgist and bishop in the Episcopal Church

Other uses
 J. Alexander's, an American restaurant chain

See also
 Jay Alexander (born 1968), American magician and comedian
 Alexander (surname), many people whose first names begin with "J" with Alexander as a surname
 Alexander (disambiguation)